SystemView may refer to:
 Former name of a product now called IBM Director
 Former name of an EEsof product now called SystemVue